Kajiado North Constituency is an electoral constituency in Kenya. It is one of five constituencies in Kajiado County. The constituency was established for the 1966 elections. The entire area of the constituency is located in Kajiado County.

Hon Joseph W Manje represents the constituency.

Members of Parliament

Locations and wards

See also
Other constituencies in kajiado county
Kajiado West constituency
Kajiado Central Constituency constituency

References

External links 
Map of the constituency

Constituencies in Kajiado County
Constituencies in Rift Valley Province
1966 establishments in Kenya
Constituencies established in 1966